State Employees' Credit Union (SECU) is a North Carolina state chartered credit union headquartered in Raleigh, North Carolina regulated under the authority of the Credit Union Division of the NC Department of Commerce. SECU member deposits are insured by  National Credit Union Administration (NCUA) of the U.S. federal government.  SECU is the second largest natural member credit union in the United States, both in asset size and in membership.  As of August 28, 2022, SECU has $53.1 billion in assets, over 2.6 million members, and 270 branches with locations in all of North Carolina's 100 counties. SECU operates the no-fee CashPoints automated teller machine network, which is the largest ATM network in North Carolina. Membership in the credit union is primarily limited to employees of the state of North Carolina and their immediate family or the immediate family of current SECU members.

History
State Employees' Credit Union was originally incorporated on June 4, 1937 by employees of the State of North Carolina.  The credit union began with $437 in assets and 17 members and was first operated from the basement of Raleigh's Agriculture Building. By 1960, the credit union grew to serve over 70,000 members and had assets of almost $25 million. 

By 2022, State Employees' Credit Union had grown to over $53.1 Billion in assets and 2.6 million members. This made State Employees' the second largest credit union in the United States in terms of assets and membership. Total membership amounts to approximately one-quarter of all North Carolinians.

Shared Branches 
A few otherwise independent credit unions share SECU's branches.

Local Government Federal Credit Union's scope of membership is very similar to SECU's, except it is open to persons associated with county, city, and similar level government agencies in North Carolina. Originally, LGFCU and SECU were a single credit union. However, LGFCU split off in response to criticism the original credit union was accepting members beyond its scope of membership.

The North Carolina Press Association Federal Credit Union (NCPAFCU) is open to employees and other persons associated with most of the newspapers that are members of the North Carolina Press Association.

Community support programs 

In 2004, SECU Foundation was formed by SECU to promote community development in North Carolina communities. The Foundation promotes local and community development by primarily funding high impact projects in the areas of housing, education, healthcare and human services. The State Employees’ Credit Union Board of Directors chartered the SECU Foundation to help identify and address community issues that are beyond the normal scope of State Employees’ Credit Union. Funding is provided by individual members that make the contribution, enforcing the core concept of State Employees’ Credit Union as a member-owned cooperative. Projects are funded by the SECU Foundation through “member-owners of SECU,” not by the Credit Union. Therefore, credit for the projects will rightfully be awarded to the SECU members making the contributions. SECU Foundation does not fund projects outside the state of North Carolina.

In 2009, SECU announced a $4 million grant to the North Carolina Museum of Natural Sciences for their planned Nature Research Center.

See also 
 Pennsylvania State Employees Credit Union
 S.C. State Credit Union
 State Employees Credit Union of Maryland
 State Employees Credit Union of New Mexico
 Washington State Employees Credit Union

References

External links
Official website

Credit unions based in North Carolina
Companies based in Raleigh, North Carolina
Privately held companies based in North Carolina
Banks established in 1937
1937 establishments in North Carolina
American companies established in 1937